Ancistrus falconensis is a species of catfish in the family Loricariidae. It is a freshwater species native to South America, where it occurs in the Hueque River and the Ricoa River in the state of Falcón in Venezuela. The species reaches at least 16.12 cm (6.3 inches) SL and was described in 2010 by Donald C. Taphorn, Jonathan W. Armbruster, and Douglas Rodríguez-Olarte on the basis of morphological differences from the species Ancistrus gymnorhynchus, which occurs in a similar geographic region.

References 

falconensis
Fish described in 2010
Catfish of South America